Karsten or Carsten is a both a given name and a surname. It is believed to be either derived from a Low German form of Christian, or "man from karst". Notable persons with the name include:

Given name
Carsten
 Carsten Charles Sabathia (born 1980), Former baseball player most famous for being a New York Yankee
 Carsten Niebuhr (1733–1815), German mathematician, cartographer, and explorer in the service of Denmark
 Carsten Pohl (born 1965), German basketball coach

Karsten
 Karsten Alnæs (born 1938), Norwegian author, historian, and journalist
 Karsten Andersen (1920–1997), Norwegian conductor
 Big Daddy Karsten (born 1989), 2017 Eurovision Jury List; Norwegian Pre-select for Eurovision (Melodi Grand Prix 2021)
 Karsten Buer (1913–1993), Norwegian harness coach
 Karsten Fonstad (1900–1970), Norwegian politician
 Karsten Forsterling (born 1980), Australian rower
 Karsten Isachsen (1944–2016), Norwegian Lutheran priest, essayist and public speaker
 Karsten Jakobsen (1928–2019), Norwegian engineer
 Karsten Johannessen (1925–2018), Norwegian footballer and coach
 Karsten Kroon (born 29 January 1976), Dutch former professional road bicycle racer
 Karsten Solheim (1911-2000), Norwegian-born American golf club designer and businessman
 Karsten Warholm (born 1996), Norwegian athlete

Surname
 Adrian Karsten (1960–2005), U.S. college football reporter
 Christoffer Christian Karsten (1756–1827), Swedish opera singer
 Ekaterina Karsten (born 1972), Belarusian Olympic rower
 Elisabeth Charlotta Karsten (1783-1856), Swedish painter
 Frank Karsten (born 1984), Dutch Magic: The Gathering player
 Frank M. Karsten (1913–1992), U.S. politician
 George Karsten (1863-1937), German botanist
 Gustav Karl Wilhelm Hermann Karsten (1817–1908), German botanist and geologist
 Gustav Karsten (1820–1900), German physicist 
 Kai Karsten (born 1968), German Olympic sprinter
 Karl Johann Bernhard Karsten (1782–1853), German mineralogist
 Karl G. Karsten (1891-1968), American economist, statistician and businessman
 Petter Adolf Karsten (1834–1917), Finnish mycologist
 Sophie Karsten (1783-1862), Swedish dancer and artist
 Sophie Mariane Karsten (1753-1848), Polish opera singer
 Thomas Karsten (1885–1945), Dutch engineer
 Wenceslaus Johann Gustav Karsten (1732-1787), German mathematician

See also 

 
Carlsten (name)
 Carstens
 Karstens (disambiguation)

References 

German masculine given names
Low German given names
Norwegian masculine given names